Metaeuchromius is a genus of moths of the family Crambidae.

Species
Metaeuchromius anacanthus W. Li & H. Li in Li, Li & Nuss, 2009
Metaeuchromius changensis Schouten, 1997
Metaeuchromius circe Bleszynski, 1965
Metaeuchromius euzonella (Hampson, 1896)
Metaeuchromius flavofascialis Park, 1990
Metaeuchromius fulvusalis Song & Chen in Chen, Song & Yuan, 2002
Metaeuchromius glacialis Li, 2015
Metaeuchromius grisalis Song & Chen in Chen, Song & Yuan, 2002
Metaeuchromius inflatus Schouten, 1997
Metaeuchromius kimurai Sasaki, 2005
Metaeuchromius lata (Staudinger, 1870)
Metaeuchromius latoides Schouten, 1997
Metaeuchromius singulispinalis W. Li & H. Li in Li, Li & Nuss, 2009
Metaeuchromius yuennanensis (Caradja in Caradja & Meyrick, 1937)
Metaeuchromius yusufeliensis Nuss & Speidel, 1999

References

Natural History Museum Lepidoptera genus database

Crambinae
Crambidae genera
Taxa named by Stanisław Błeszyński